Pier Francesco Foggini or Pietro Francisco Foggini (1713 – 31 May 1783) was an Italian writer.
Foggini, an Italian archaeologist, was born in 1713 at Florence, devoted himself to the Church, and was made doctor at Pisa. In 1741 he published De primis Florentinorum Apostolis, and an edition of Virgil (Florence, 4to). In 1742 Foggini accepted an invitation from Giovanni Gaetano Bottari, second librarian of the Vatican, to come to Rome, where Benedict XIV gave him a place in the pontifical academy of history, and made him sub-librarian at the Vatican. In 1775 he succeeded Bottari as librarian. He died at Rome on 31 May 1783. He devoted a great part of his life to the study of the manuscripts of the Vatican; and published, besides the works already mentioned, Epiphanius, De XII gemmis, etc. (Rome, 1743, 4to):—Epiphanius, Comment. in Cant. (Rome, 1750, 4to): — Appendix Historiae Byzantinae (Rome, 1777). — Hoefer, Nouv. Biog. Generale, 18:35.

References

External links 
 

1713 births
1783 deaths
Archaeologists from Florence
Italian librarians
Writers from Florence